December 11 - Eastern Orthodox liturgical calendar - December 13

All fixed commemorations below celebrated on December 25 by Orthodox Churches on the Old Calendar.

For December 12th, Orthodox Churches on the Old Calendar commemorate the Saints listed on November 29.

Saints
 Hieromartyr Alexander of Jerusalem, Bishop of Jerusalem (250-251)
 Martyr Aitherius (Aetherius), under Maximian, tortured and beheaded for refusing to sacrifice to idols (c. 286 - 305)
 Saint Spyridon the Wonderworker, Bishop of Tremithus (348)
 Venerable Amonathus, monk.
 Venerable Anthus, monk.
 Saint Euphemiane.
 Martyr John, Abbot of the Zedazeni Monastery, Georgia (9th century) (see also: May 7 )

Pre-Schism Western saints
 Martyr Synesius (Synetus) of Rome, a Reader, tortured and beheaded for refusing to sacrifice to idols (270-275)
 Martyrs Maxentius, Constantius, Crescentius, Justinus and their Companions, martyrs in Trier in Germany in the reign of Diocletian, under the governor Rictiovarus (c. 287)
 Saint Abra of Poitiers, daughter of St Hilary of Poitiers in France (c. 360)
 Saint Corentinus of Quimper, first Bishop of Quimper in Brittany, he had lived as a hermit at Plomodiern (490)
 Saint Finian of Clonard and Skellig Michael, teacher of Ireland and one of the fathers of Irish monasticism (549)
 Saint Columba of Terryglass (Columba of Tyrdaglas), born in Leinster in Ireland, he was a disciple of St Finian and Abbot of Tyrdaglas in Munster (552)  (see also: December 13)
 Saint Gregory of Terracina, a disciple of St Benedict, and with his brother St Speciosus, a monk at Terracina in Italy (c. 570)
 Saint Cormac (Cormac mac Eogain), an Abbot in Ireland and friend of St Columba (6th century)
 Saint Colman of Glendalough in Ireland, Abbot (659)
 Saint Agatha, nun at Wimborne in Dorset in England and a disciple of St Lioba, she went to Germany to help St Boniface in his missionary work (c. 790)

Post-Schism Orthodox saints
Saint John, Metropolitan of Zichon, founder of the Monastery of the Forerunner on Mt. Menikion (north-east of Serres) (1333)
 Venerable Therapontus, Abbot of Monza (1597)

Other commemorations
 Synaxis of the First Martyrs of the American land: 
 Hieromartyr Juvenal the Protomartyr of America (1796)
 Peter (Cungagnaq) the Aleut, tortured and slain by Franciscan friars at San Francisco, California (c. 1815) 
 Hieromartyr Anatole (Kamensky) of Irkutsk (1925)
 Hieromartyr Seraphim (Samoilovich) of Uglich (1937)
 Hieromartyr John (Kochurov) of Chicago, priest, slain in Russia (1917)
 Hieromartyr Alexander (Khotovitsky) of New York, priest, slain in Russia (1937)
 Repose of Flegont (Ostrovsky), Stylite of Kimlyai, Mordovia (1870)

Icon gallery

Notes

References

Sources 
 December 12/25. Orthodox Calendar (PRAVOSLAVIE.RU).
 December 25 / December 12. HOLY TRINITY RUSSIAN ORTHODOX CHURCH (A parish of the Patriarchate of Moscow).
 December 12. OCA - The Lives of the Saints.
 The Autonomous Orthodox Metropolia of Western Europe and the Americas (ROCOR). St. Hilarion Calendar of Saints for the year of our Lord 2004. St. Hilarion Press (Austin, TX). p. 93.
 December 12. Latin Saints of the Orthodox Patriarchate of Rome.
 The Roman Martyrology. Transl. by the Archbishop of Baltimore. Last Edition, According to the Copy Printed at Rome in 1914. Revised Edition, with the Imprimatur of His Eminence Cardinal Gibbons. Baltimore: John Murphy Company, 1916.
Greek Sources
 Great Synaxaristes:  12 ΔΕΚΕΜΒΡΙΟΥ. ΜΕΓΑΣ ΣΥΝΑΞΑΡΙΣΤΗΣ.
  Συναξαριστής. 12 Δεκεμβρίου. ECCLESIA.GR. (H ΕΚΚΛΗΣΙΑ ΤΗΣ ΕΛΛΑΔΟΣ). 
Russian Sources
  25 декабря (12 декабря). Православная Энциклопедия под редакцией Патриарха Московского и всея Руси Кирилла (электронная версия). (Orthodox Encyclopedia - Pravenc.ru).
  12 декабря (ст.ст.) 25 декабря 2013 (нов. ст.). Русская Православная Церковь Отдел внешних церковных связей. (DECR).

December in the Eastern Orthodox calendar